Miami County is the name of four counties in the United States:

 Miami-Dade County, Florida
 Miami County, Indiana 
 Miami County, Kansas 
 Miami County, Ohio